Scotorythra epixantha is a moth of the family Geometridae. It was described by Perkins in 1901. It is endemic to the Hawaiian island of Oahu.

External links

E
Endemic moths of Hawaii
Biota of Oahu